Leivonmäki is a former municipality of Finland in the Central Finland region. It became a part of Joutsa in 2008.

It is known for its marshy grounds and its national park.

The municipality was unilingually Finnish.

Villages 
Etu-Ikola, Havumäki, Kivisuo, Lapinkylä, Leivonmäki, Martinkylä, Rutalahti, Savenaho, Selänpohja, Taka-Ikola

History 
Leivonmäki was first mentioned in 1564 as Leijuomeki. Its name means "skylark's hill", though according to Väinö Voionmaa, the name is intermediately derived from the farm name Leivonen in Sääksmäki. Leivonmäki has also been known as Levonmäki (roughly "resting hill"), which Terho Itkonen considered to be the original name. Almost all old documents call the settlement Leivonmäki or a variant of it, therefore the variant Levonmäki may be Savonian influence, as leivo is sometimes pronounced as leevo in the Savonian dialects.

Leivonmäki was a part of the Sysmä parish until it was transferred to the new Hartola parish together with Joutsa in 1784. Leivonmäki acquired a chapel in 1772 and a church in 1850. It became a separate municipality in 1870, but ecclesiastically it was still subordinate to Hartola until 1880.

Leivonmäki was consolidated with Joutsa in 2008.

Twinnings
Leivonmäki was twinned with Estonian Municipality Haaslava Parish.

References

External links 

Municipality of Joutsa – Official website

Joutsa
Populated places disestablished in 2008
Former municipalities of Finland